1928 Országos Bajnokság I (men's water polo) was the 22nd water polo championship in Hungary. There were seven teams who played one round match for the title.

Final list 

* M: Matches W: Win D: Drawn L: Lost G+: Goals earned G-: Goals got P: Point

2. Class 

1. OTE 8, 2. BSZKRT SE 4, 3. BEAC 4 pont, Postás and VAC cancelled their participation.

Countryside 

1. Szegedi UE, 2. MOVE Eger SE, 3. Orosházi TK, 4. Tatabányai SC.

Sources 
Gyarmati Dezső: Aranykor (Hérodotosz Könyvkiadó és Értékesítő Bt., Budapest, 2002.)
Sport-évkönyv 1928

1928 in water polo
1928 in Hungarian sport
Seasons in Hungarian water polo competitions